Jess Row (born 1974 in Washington, D.C.) is an American short story writer, novelist, and professor.

Early life
He received a B.A. in English from Yale University in 1997. He later taught English in Hong Kong for two years. He completed his Master of Fine Arts in creative writing at the University of Michigan in 2001.

Career
His debut novel Your Face in Mine (Riverhead, 2014) explored racial reassignment surgery against the backdrop of post-industrial Baltimore.

His stories have appeared in various publications, including The New Yorker, Harvard Review, Ploughshares, Granta, Witness, The Atlantic, Kyoto Journal and the Best American Short Stories of 2001 and 2003.

He was an associate professor of English at The College of New Jersey and as of 2021 teaches at New York University as a professor of English and used to teach  in the Writing Program at Vermont College of Fine Arts. He is also a teacher and student of Zen Buddhism.

Awards
He has received many awards for his fiction, among them a  Whiting Award, a Pushcart Prize, and a fellowship from the National Endowment for the Arts. In 2018, he received a Whiting Creative Nonfiction Grant to complete his book White Flights: Race, Fiction and the American Imagination. Most notably, Professor Row won the Guggenheim Fellowship.

Personal life
He currently resides in New York City with his wife Sonya Posmentier and his two children.

Works

Books

"Heaven Lake," Reprinted from Harvard Review 22, Spring 2002

Short Stories

Articles and Essays

 (Subscription Required)

References

External links

Author's Official Website
Kyoto Journal magazine
Profile at The Whiting Foundation
Review of The Train to Lo Wu at WaterBridge Review
Review of Your Face in Mine at The New York Times

1974 births
Living people
American Buddhists
Writers from New Jersey
Yale University alumni
University of Michigan alumni
The College of New Jersey faculty
Writers from Washington, D.C.
American male novelists